"Drowning (Face Down)" is the third single by American rock band Saving Abel from their self-titled debut album.
"Drowning (Face Down)" peaked number 24 on the Billboard Hot Modern Rock Tracks chart and number 3 on the Hot Mainstream Rock Tracks chart.

The music video was made on March 20, 2009, and was released on April 30. The video was shot in part at A2 Wind Tunnel, in Mooresville, North Carolina.  The video features former NASCAR owner/driver Jeremy Mayfield, with cameos by drivers Carl Edwards, Clint Bowyer, Martin Truex Jr., and Brian Vickers.

Charts

Weekly charts

Year-end charts

Release history

References

2008 songs
2009 singles
Saving Abel songs
Virgin Records singles
Songs written by Skidd Mills